Huntington Lake (formerly, Basin) is an unincorporated community in Fresno County, California.

The Basin post office opened in 1913, the name was changed to Huntington Lake in 1916.

Climate
This region experiences warm (but not hot) and dry summers, with no average monthly temperatures above 71.6 °F. 
Summers typically feature warm daytime temperatures between 75 and 85 degrees Fahrenheit, and can occasionally top 90 degrees. Lake breezes are common, which can help temper the warm daytime temperatures. Due to Huntington Lake's elevation, nighttime temperatures are significantly cooler than daytime temperatures, with low temperatures ranging between 40 and 50 degrees Fahrenheit. Most summer days start off clear and cool, with afternoon thunderstorms occurring on most summer afternoons. These storms can occasionally produce hail and even snow. Winters are cool and chilly but average monthly temperatures typically remain at or above freezing. Snow is common in winter and averages around 12 inches of snow per year. According to the Köppen Climate Classification system, Huntington Lake has a warm-summer Mediterranean climate, abbreviated "Csb" on climate maps.

References

Unincorporated communities in California
Unincorporated communities in Fresno County, California